Julius Popper (December 15, 1857 – June 5, 1893), also known in Spanish as Julio Popper, was a Wallachian-born Romanian-Argentine engineer, adventurer, and explorer. Popper was one of the perpetrators of the genocide against the native Selk'nam people.

He was known as a modern "conquistador" of Tierra del Fuego in southern South America, and was a controversial and influential figure. He may have produced plans for the modern outline of the city of Havana, Cuba.

Life

Popper was born in 1857 to a Jewish family in Bucharest, Romania, son of professor Neftali Popper, a successful antiques merchant, and his wife Peppi. He studied in Paris, gaining credentials as an engineer.

After working in Europe for several years, he took a job working on the infrastructure for the telegraph in Chile. He arrived in Argentina in 1885, where he became attracted by the possibility of gold mining in Tierra del Fuego. In 1886 he received a permit from the Argentine Government to form an exploration company to mine for gold near San Sebastián. On September 7, he led an 18-man expedition that included a chief engineer, a mineralogist, a journalist and a photographer. They found gold dust on the beach of El Páramo, in San Sebastián Bay. The expedition was rigorously and strictly enforced according to military standards with heavily armed men, with Popper in direct command of everything. 

During the expedition, Popper and his men were allegedly attacked by eighty Selk'nam (Ona) armed with bows. The adventurers responded by firing their Winchester rifles, killing all but two of the Selk'nam. After the fight, Popper "posed his men in the attitude of troops repelling a charge, took a position himself astride one of the dead Indians, and then had the outfit photographed for subsequent use."  

Popper succeeded in unearthing large amounts of gold and his Compania de Lavaderos de Oro del Sud realized enormous capital gains on the Argentine stock exchange.

In Patagonia, Popper maintained dominance with his private army. He issued his own coins and stamps to symbolize his power. When the Argentine peso lost its value in the market crash of 1890, his gold coins were regarded as currency.

Popper vigorously fought against his enemies; he punished gold diggers and thieves according to arbitrary law. The most controversial aspect of his life was his participation in the Selk'nam genocide against the native communities on Tierra del Fuego. Sheep farmers and gold miners fought against them; the former because the Selk'nam would hunt sheep in their former territories and the latter because of conflicts over mining areas. Together with other bounty hunters, who were paid to kill the Selk'nam, Popper too sent his armed forces to manhunt them.

Popper also prepared an expedition to enforce the Argentine claim for parts of Antarctica.

After his sudden death in Buenos Aires at the age of 35, his empire collapsed. The cause of his death has not been established. Contemporary American journalist John R. Spears says that he was poisoned by "men whom he had offended in the south."

Photographic archive
In July 2022 The Wilhelm Filderman Center for the Study of the History of the Jews of Romania intends to mount an exhibition celebrating the life of Popper  in one of the synagogues of the Romanian capital. It consists of a selection of the hundred photographs of the expedition that Popper himself sent to his family in Bucharest at the time and which collection had previously been conserved in the Romanian national Archives

In fiction
 Daniel Ares wrote a novel about Popper's life called Popper – la Patagonia del oro.
 Patricio Manns features him as one of the main characters of his novel, El Corazón a Contraluz (1996).
Jacob Popper wrote a novel about his great-great-uncle in Roumanian called "Estrellita si regele tarei de Foc" (1992).
 He was played by Cuban actor Jorge Perugorría in the film Tierra del Fuego (2000), where he appears as a Romanian Orthodox man working for Queen Carmen Sylva of Romania.
 Popper figures in the back-story to the short story "Tierra del Fuego" by Francisco Coloane, on which the film was based.
 In a play written by Céline Monsarrat, La mère de la mariée, his story is briefly but accurately explained, and emotionally described.
 The name of the Concepcion-based Chilean blues / rockabilly band "Julius Popper" pays tribute to Popper.

References

Further reading
 
  English extract.
 
 
 

1857 births
1893 deaths
19th-century people from the Ottoman Empire
Engineers from Bucharest
Romanian Jews
Economic history of Argentina
Explorers of South America
Genocide perpetrators
Romanian explorers
Romanian emigrants to Argentina
Romanian
Argentine people of Romanian descent
History of Tierra del Fuego
Naturalized citizens of Argentina
Romanian cartographers
Argentine cartographers
Jewish Argentine history
19th century in Havana